Paphos Castle is located at the western end of the city port. It was originally a Byzantine fortress built to protect the port. Today, the visitor can see the Western Frankish Tower with the Venetian additions as restored by the Ottomans in 1592, according to a relevant inscription above the entrance of the castle. A white marble slab (dimensions: 150 × 40 cm) above the entrance of the tower refers to its reconstruction in 1592 AD, by the Turkish governor of Cyprus Ahmet Pasha (1589–1593).

The main fortress of the city was located in Saranta Kolones, about 600 meters west, and was destroyed by the earthquake of 1222.

History 

The original Byzantine fortress was destroyed in the earthquake of 1222. It was rebuilt and expanded by the Lusignans in the 13th century. They also built the so-called "Genoese Towers". It is a castle consisting of a complex of 2 towers, the ruins of which are located 80 meters east of the Castle, right at the entrance of the port and served as the best defense. Although these towers were considered subservient to the larger castle they had no contact with each other and were probably a separate castle. They got their name because of their importance in the battle against the Genoese in 1373, where they played an important role in the defense of the city port, as the Genoese were mainly a naval force. They were also important in the battle against the Mamluks in 1426, where they suffered severe damage and have not been rebuilt since. The Towers were destroyed after a strong earthquake in 1491, but their ruins are still visible. The castle was maintained by the Venetians who made some additions.

The Castle resisted the Genoese invasion in 1373 and was one of the few not covered by the Mamluks in 1426, under the guidance of its Guardsman, Sforza, who was a fierce Spanish mercenary. In August 1570, when the Turks landed, his guard failed to leave it, as was the case in other cases. Despite the bravery of the defenders and the good position of the Castle after 16 days of fierce fighting, his guard resisted inside the Castle which was destroyed. The Ottomans repaired the ruins of the castle, based on the original building, as due to its strong construction there was no complete destruction. The castle during the Turkish occupation had a guard of 100 men and 12 cannons which left with the arrival of the British in 1878.

Architecture 

The main part of the castle consists of a large rectangular tower (dimensions: 40 × 20 m) with a closed courtyard in the middle. The ground floor consists of a central hall with small rooms and large rooms on each of its two large sides, which were used as prisons and barracks during the Ottoman rule. On the roof there is a small square Tower (dimensions: 15 × 10 m) with three large rooms, where the Guard of the Castle lived. At the same level around the perimeter there are 12 ramparts on the roof, which could hold a corresponding number of cannons during the Turkish occupation. 

In 1878, with the arrival of the British, the Castle ceased to be used for military purposes and became a salt depot until 1935, when it was declared an ancient monument under the Antiquities Act. Since then it represents one of the most characteristic landmarks of the city of Paphos. In 1938-9 various cracks in the walls and the breakwater were repaired. The castle was devastated by the earthquake of 1953 and repairs were completed in 1969. It was also hit by the Turkish air and naval forces during the bombing of the port of Paphos on July 21, 1974,  but suffered no serious damage. Most recently, the castle serves as the setting for the annual Paphos Outdoor Cultural Festival in September. Several archeological excavations have been carried out to investigate its past.

Tourism 

Currently, the castle is used as a tourist attraction and occasionally has thematic exhibitions. Admission is € 2.50, visiting hours are 8: 30-17: 00 in winter and 8: 30-19: 30 during summer. The ground floor of the Castle is accessible for people using a wheelchair, but not the Upper floor.

References

External links 

 

13th-century fortifications
Castles in Cyprus
Buildings and structures in Paphos